Play Kurt Weill is a cover album released by Swiss Industrial band The Young Gods. The album comprises interpretations of pieces by German composer Kurt Weill. The band played the entire track list during the Kurt Weill tribute concert in Switzerland in September 1989.

A remastered version was released in 2021, for the album's 30th anniversary.

Track listing

Personnel
Adapted from the liner notes of The Young Gods Play Kurt Weill.

The Young Gods
 Alain Monod – keyboards
 Use Hiestand – drums
 Franz Treichler – vocals

Production and additional personnel
 Voco Fauxpas – engineering
 Roli Mosimann – production
 Howie Weinberg – mastering

Release history

References

External links
 

The Young Gods albums
1991 albums
Kurt Weill tribute albums
Albums produced by Roli Mosimann
PIAS Recordings albums